Elections to South Ribble Borough Council were held on 2 May 1991. The whole council was up for election and the Conservative Party retained control of the council.

Election result

|}

Ward Results

References
 The Elections Centre, South Ribble Borough Council Election Results (PDF)

1991 English local elections
1991
1990s in Lancashire